The Annie Award for Editorial in a Feature Production is an Annie Award given annually to recognize the excellence by the work of editors and editing teams in animated feature films. It was first presented at the 40th Annie Awards.

Winners and nominees

2010s

2020s

References

External links 
 Annie Awards: Legacy

Annie Awards
Film editing awards